KKBS (92.7 FM) is a radio station  broadcasting an album-oriented rock format. Licensed to Guymon, Oklahoma, United States, the station serves the SW Kansas area.  The station is currently owned by Mls Communications, Inc.

Translators
In addition to the main station, KKBS is relayed by an additional translator to widen its broadcast area.

References

External links
KKBS website

KBS
Album-oriented rock radio stations in the United States
Radio stations established in 1983